Daniel Quinn (1935–2018) was an American writer.

Daniel Quinn may also refer to:

 Daniel Quinn (actor) (1956–2015), American actor
 Daniel Quinn (rugby league) (born 1978), rugby league footballer
 Daniel J. Quinn (1864–1940), president of Fordham University
 Daniel Patrick Quinn (born 1981), British musician, composer, producer and performer
 Dan Quinn (American football) (born 1970), American football coach
 Dan Quinn (fighter) (born 1967), American former football player and MMA fighter
 Dan Quinn (ice hockey) (born 1965), Canadian former NHL ice hockey centre
 Dan W. Quinn (1859–1938), American singer

See also:
 Daniel Quinn (Paul Auster character), fictional writer in the novel City of Glass by Paul Auster
 "Dan Quin", a pseudonym sometimes used by Alfred Henry Lewis (1855–1914)